Ridley is a surname and given name that originated from locations in Cheshire, Kent, Northumberland, and Essex counties in England.

People

Surname 
 Aaron Ridley, British philosopher
 Aaron J. Ridley, American atmospheric researcher
 Adam Ridley (born 1942), British economist
 Alan Ridley (1910–1993), Australian rugby league footballer who played in the 1920s and 1930s
 Alice Tan Ridley (born 1952), gospel and R&B singer
 Andrew Ridley (born 1968), Australian cricketer
 Arnold Ridley (1896–1984), English actor
 Bill Ridley (1934–2019), American basketball player
 Brian Ridley (born 1931), British solid-state physicist 
 Calvin Ridley (born 1994), American football player
 Cicely Ridley (1927–2008), British-American applied mathematician
 Daisy Ridley (born 1992), English actress
 David Ridley (born 1954), English cricketer
 F. A. Ridley (1897–1994), British marxist, secularist, and writer
 Fred Ridley (born 1952), American amateur golfer and golf administrator
 Florida Ruffin Ridley (1861–1943), African-American civil rights activist, teacher, writer, and editor
 Gary Ridley (1945-2022), American engineers
 George Ridley (Labour politician) (1886–1944), British Member of Parliament
 George Ridley (Whig politician) (1818–1887), British Member of Parliament
 Greg Ridley (1942–2003), English rock bassist
 Harold Ridley (Jesuit) (1939–2005), President of Loyola College, Maryland (1994–2005)
 Harold Ridley (ophthalmologist) (1906–2001), English ophthalmologist
 Henry Nicholas Ridley (1855–1956), English botanist
 Humphrey Ridley  (1653–1708), English physician
 Ian Ridley (1934–2008), Australian rules footballer
 Jack Ridley (engineer) (1919–2006), New Zealand civil engineer and politician
 Jack Ridley (pilot) (1915–1957), American aeronautical engineer, and U.S. Air Force test pilot and officer
 James Ridley (footballer), English footballer
 Jane Ridley (born 1953), British biographer
 Jasper Nicholas Ridley (1887–1951), British banker   
 Jasper Ridley (1920–2004), British writer known for historical biographies
 Jeanne Clare Ridley (1925–2007), American sociologist, statistician, and demographer
 John Ridley (born 1965), American film director, actor, and writer
 John Ridley (footballer) (born 1952), English soccer player
 John Ridley (inventor) (1806–1887), best known for "Ridley's Stripper"
 John S. Ridley (1882–1934), Canadian politician
 Lancelot Ridley (died 1576), divinity rector of Stretham and father of physician Mark Ridley
 Mabel Ridley (1895–1938), African-American singer
 Malcolm Ridley (born 1966), actor and writer
 Mark Ridley (physician) (1560–1624), English physician and mathematician
 Mark Ridley (zoologist) (born 1956), English zoologist
 Matt Ridley (born 1958), British science writer, financier
 Matthew Ridley, 1st Viscount Ridley (1842–1904), British politician and statesman
 Roy Ridley (1890–1969), academic, writer and poet
 Mike Ridley (born 1963), ice hockey centre
 Nicholas Ridley (martyr) (died 1555), English bishop 
 Nicholas Ridley, Baron Ridley of Liddesdale (1929–1993), British politician
 Philip Ridley (born 1964), British artist
 Riley Ridley (born 1996) American football player
 Rita Ridley (1946–2013), English runner
 Rosalind Ridley (born 1949) Neuropsychologist
 Stevan Ridley (born 1989), American football player
 Yvonne Ridley (born 1958), English journalist

Given name 
 Ridley Jacobs (born 1967), West Indian cricketer
 Ridley Pakenham-Walsh (1888–1966), British general
 Ridley Scott (born 1937), English film director
 Ridley Pearson (born 1953), American Author

See also
 Viscount Ridley, a title created in 1900 for Matthew Ridley, 1st Viscount Ridley

References 

English-language surnames